Jeffs is a surname that may refer to:

A.S. Jeffs (1871–1905), American football coach
Brent W. Jeffs, American author, advocate and member of the Fundamentalist Church of Jesus Christ of Latter-Day Saints
Charles Jeffs (born 1895), British World War I flying ace
Christine Jeffs (born 1963), New Zealand director, editor and screenwriter
A. Dean Jeffs (born 1928), American politician
Ian Jeffs (born 1982), English footballer
Lance Jeffs, Australian pharmacist
Lyle Jeffs, American bishop in the Fundamentalist Church of Jesus Christ of Latter-Day Saints
Nephi Jeffs, American member of the Fundamentalist Church of Jesus Christ of Latter-Day Saints
Rulon Jeffs (1909–2002), American former President of the Fundamentalist Church of Jesus Christ of Latter-Day Saints
Seth Jeffs, American official in the Fundamentalist Church of Jesus Christ of Latter-Day Saints
Tim Jeffs (born 1965), American artist, musician, and art director
Toni Jeffs (born 1968), New Zealand freestyle swimmer
Warren Jeffs (born 1955), American former President of the Fundamentalist Church of Jesus Christ of Latter-Day Saints